Espionage is a 1937 American Proto-Noir, spy-film, adventure, drama, romance, comedy thriller film directed by Kurt Neumann and written by Leonard Lee, Ainsworth Morgan and Manuel Seff,  based on the 1935 West End play Espionage by Walter C. Hackett.  The film stars Edmund Lowe, Madge Evans, Paul Lukas, Ketti Gallian, Richard "Skeets" Gallagher, and Frank Reicher. The film was released February 26, 1937, by Metro-Goldwyn-Mayer.

Plot

Lowe plays a smart-aleck mystery novelist who agrees to board the Orient Express to get the goods on an arms dealer (Lukas) for a newspaper editor pal. But when his passport is lifted by a pickpocket (Gallagher), he finds himself forced to pose as the husband of passenger Evans, unaware that she's a reporter who's also on Lukas' trail.

Cast 
Edmund Lowe as Kenneth Stevens
Madge Evans as Patricia Booth
Paul Lukas as Anton Kronsky
Ketti Gallian as Sonia Yaloniv
Richard "Skeets" Gallagher as Jimmy Brown
Frank Reicher as Von Cram
Billy Gilbert as Turk (billed as William Gilbert)
Robert Graves as Duval
Leonid Kinskey as Maxie Burgos
Mitchell Lewis as Sondheim
Charles Trowbridge as Doyle
Barnett Parker as Bill Cordell
Nita Pike as Fleurette
Juan Torena as South American
George Sorel as Maitre d'Hotel
Gaston Glass as La Forge
Egon Brecher as Chief of Police
Leo White as Barber (uncredited)
Russell Hicks as Alfred Hartrix (uncredited)
Gino Corrado as Bandleader (uncredited)
Ann Rutherford as Train Passenger (uncredited)

References

External links 

 

1937 films
American spy thriller films
1930s spy thriller films
Metro-Goldwyn-Mayer films
Films directed by Kurt Neumann
Films set on the Orient Express
American black-and-white films
American films based on plays
1930s English-language films
1930s American films